Estadio Municipal da Malata is a multi–use stadium in Ferrol, Spain and the home stadium of Racing de Ferrol with a capacity of 12,043 seats.

Racing de Ferrol have used three main stadiums over the years, starting with Campo de Futbol Infernino which they continued to use until moving to Estadio Manuel Rivera in 1954. This was an oval shaped enclosure with a single cantilever stand. In the 1970s, a cover was erected over the popular terrace.

In 1993 the metropolitan area of Ferrol built  Estadio da Malata to the west of the town, near the valley of Serantes. The total cost of the development was 1.7 billion pesetas.

The first match to be played at A Malata took place on 18 April 1993 when Racing de Ferrol beat Atlético B 3-2. The official opening took place on 29 August 1993 with friendly match between Celta Vigo and Deportivo La Coruña.

References

External links
Estadios de España 

Football venues in Galicia (Spain)
Racing de Ferrol
Buildings and structures in the Province of A Coruña
Sports venues completed in 1993